Tessie Agana (born May 16, 1942) is a Filipina former child actress of the 1950s. She is best known for her role as the titular character in the 1951 film Roberta, which was then the highest grossing Philippine film of all time. Her mother was actress Linda Estrella. She was also known as the "Shirley Temple of the Philippines".

In 2006, Agana earned her own star at the Eastwood City Walk of Fame for her overall contribution to Philippine showbusiness.

Filmography
1950 – 13 Hakbang
1950 – Kay Ganda Mo Neneng
1951 – Kasaysayan ni Dr. Ramon Selga
1951 – Roberta
1951 – Anghel ng Pag-ibig
1951 – Ang Prinsesa at ang Pulubi
1951 – Batas ng Daigdig
1952 – Rebecca
1952 – Kerubin
1952 – Ulila ng Bataan
1953 – Munting Koronel'
1953 – Anak ng Espada1954 – Nagkita si Kerubin at si Tulisang Pugot1954 – Kung Ako'y Maging Dalaga1954 – ...At sa Wakas 
1955 – Baril o Araro?1960 – Amy, Susie, Tessie1964 – Eddie Loves Susie1969 – Rikitik Loves Rositik1969 – 9 Teeners''

References

External links

1942 births
Living people
20th-century Filipino actresses
Filipino child actresses
Filipino people of Italian descent
People from Manila